Joseph L. Bocchini Jr. (born June 26, 1944) is an American attorney and Democratic Party politician who represented New Jersey's 14th legislative district in the New Jersey General Assembly from 1982 to 1988.

Bocchini was born and raised in Trenton, New Jersey. His father was a steelworker for over forty years.

After graduating from Trenton Central High School and Murray State University with a degree in education, Bocchini taught in Hamilton Township, Mercer County, New Jersey public schools for two or three years. After teaching, he received his Juris Doctor degree from the University of Baltimore in 1971.

From 1982 to 1988, Bocchini represented the 14th district in the New Jersey General Assembly.

In 1987, Bocchini gave up his Assembly seat to challenge Mercer County Executive Bill Mathesius for re-election. Mathesius narrowly defeated Bocchini by 930 votes. Bocchini challenged Mathesius again in 1991. Mathesius announced two weeks later that he would not seek re-election, and the Republican Party nominated Bob Prunetti, a county freeholder from Ewing. Amid a statewide backlash to the policies of the Jim Florio administration, Prunetti defeated Bocchini.

In 2004, Bocchini was appointed Mercer County Prosecutor. He served two five-year terms before informing Governor Chris Christie that he would not accept re-appointment to a third term in office. Before his appointment as prosecutor, Bocchini served as a municipal court judge and municipal prosecutor in East Windsor and Washington Township (today known as Robbinsville).

References

1944 births
Living people
Democratic Party members of the New Jersey General Assembly
Murray State University alumni
People from Hamilton Township, Mercer County, New Jersey
Politicians from Trenton, New Jersey
Trenton Central High School alumni